Keratsini is a suburb in the western part of the Piraeus regional unit, part of the Athens Urban Area. Since the 2011 local government reform it is part of the municipality Keratsini-Drapetsona, of which it is the seat and a municipal unit.

Geography

The municipal unit has an area of 7.601 km2. The coastal area consists mainly of port facilities, part of the Port of Piraeus.

Culture
Keratsini has its own non-professional choir (mixed voices, SATB). It has participated many times in festivals all around Greece. The town has its own choir festival called international song festival.

Sports
Keratsini hosts the football club Keratsini FC with earlier presence in Gamma Ethniki and the basketball club Faros Keratsiniou B.C. with presence in A2 Ethniki basketball.

Historical population

International relations

Keratsini is twinned with Prešov, Slovakia, since 1994.

References

External links
Official website 

Populated places in Piraeus (regional unit)